The Thomas Lumb Three-Decker is a historic triple decker house in Worcester, Massachusetts.  It is a well-preserved example of the style in Worcester's Piedmont section with Queen Anne styling.  The building follows the typical side hall plan, and features porches on the front with turned posts and spindle friezes.  Other details, including decorative brackets in the extended roof overhang and elements of the window surrounds, have been lost since the property was listed on the National Register of Historic Places in 1990.

See also
Thomas Lumb Three-Decker (Winfield Street)
National Register of Historic Places listings in southwestern Worcester, Massachusetts
National Register of Historic Places listings in Worcester County, Massachusetts

References

Apartment buildings in Worcester, Massachusetts
Apartment buildings on the National Register of Historic Places in Massachusetts
Queen Anne architecture in Massachusetts
Houses completed in 1894
Triple-decker apartment houses
National Register of Historic Places in Worcester, Massachusetts